The Itz is a river of Thuringia and Bavaria, Germany.

The Itz begins in Sachsenbrunn (Stelzen), Thuringia and flows southward through Bachfeld and Schalkau. It crosses into Bavaria and feeds the Froschgrundsee  reservoir. It continues through Dörfles-Esbach, Coburg, and Großheirath, then is joined by the Rodach north of Itzgrund. It continues southward to Rattelsdorf and Baunach, where it joins the Main.

The Itz flooded Coburg in early 2003.

See also
List of rivers of Thuringia
List of rivers of Bavaria

References

 
Rivers of Thuringia
Rivers of Bavaria
Coburg
Coburg (district)
Bamberg (district)
Haßberge (district)
Rivers of Germany